Czesław Lenc (14 April 1926 – 7 January 1998) was a Polish footballer who played as a left-back in defense. Born in Chojnice, Lenc started playing football with his local team Chojniczanka Chojnice in 1945, before moving to Lechia Gdańsk in 1948 and spending 14 seasons with the club.

Biography
Lenc played 3 seasons with Chojniczanka, during which period he became an important player for the club. In 1948 he moved to Lechia Gdańsk where in his first season he helped Lechia win promotion to the I Liga by winning the league. Lenc was in the first Lechia team to play in the top division in 1949. During his time with Lechia he won the II Liga, also finished as runners up once, reached the final of the Polish Cup, finished as runners-up after losing 5-0 to Legia Warsaw, and was involved in Lechia's joint highest finish in the Polish league, 3rd, which was achieved in 1956 and has only been matched once in 2019. In total he played 232 games, scoring 4 goals in all competitions with Lechia. Lenc features highly on the list of all-time appearances made for Lechia, and is currently 3rd on the list for appearances made in the top division with 182.

Honours
Lechia Gdańsk
I liga
Third place: 1956

Polish Cup
Runners-up: 1955

II liga
Winners: 1951
Runners-up: 1954

References

1926 births
1998 deaths
Chojniczanka Chojnice players
Lechia Gdańsk players
Polish footballers
People from Chojnice
Sportspeople from Pomeranian Voivodeship
Association football defenders